Pignatelli is an Italian surname which may refer to:

People
House of Pignatelli, an aristocratic family of Naples
Fabio Pignatelli (b. 1953), Italian musician
Luca Pignatelli (b. 1962), Italian artist

Places
Villa Pignatelli, a museum in Naples
Santa Maria Assunta dei Pignatelli, a church in Naples

Italian-language surnames